Nada Rowand (born November 30, 1936) is an American actress, best known for her role as Kate Rescott Slavinsky on the ABC daytime soap opera Loving.

Career
Rowand was born in Sparta, Illinois. She graduated from the University of Illinois. Originally, she planned to be an opera singer, but after that didn't bring her significant success, she began studying to be an actress under Uta Hagen.

She has numerous stage credits, including a singing role on Broadway in The Unsinkable Molly Brown from 1960 to 1962, a part in Milk and Honey, and her role as a townswoman in Walking Happy from 1966 to 1967. Later, in 1979, she played Elizabeth, Duchess of York in the Broadway production of King Richard III. In 1980, for the Humana Festival at the Actors Theatre of Louisville in Louisville, Kentucky, she appeared in two productions: in Adele Edling Shank's play Sunrise/Sunset as Louise, and as Yvonne in Kent Broadhurst's play They're Coming to Make It Brighter.

In 1984, Rowand won her most recognizable role to date of Kate Rescott on the fledgling ABC soap opera Loving. The character of Kate ran a boarding house in the show's setting of Corinth, Pennsylvania, which opened its doors to a steady stream of young tenants who sought refuge in Corinth—and in Kate's warm mothering and advice—from their troublesome lives and various romantic entanglements. Kate was also the mother of the scheming, long-running character Ava Rescott Forbes Alden Masters (played notably by Roya Megnot and later by Lisa Peluso), who often benefited from Kate grounding her back to reality.

In 1990, Rowand received attention for her work on Loving when the Kate character was diagnosed with cervical cancer. Kate subsequently had a hysterectomy on the show and went into remission, all while being courted by sanitation worker Louie Slavinsky (Bernard Barrow), whom she married later that year. Rowand remained on Loving through the show's final episode in November 1995.

Rowand's other television credits include guest roles on Bewitched, Highway to Heaven (in the two-part premiere of season three, "A Special Love"), Kate & Allie,  and on Law & Order, where she appeared twice, each time as a different character. In cinema, she has had roles in Super Seal, F.I.S.T., and Masquerade, and played Clara Brockway in the 1985 TV special Blind Alleys alongside Pat Morita and Cloris Leachman. In 1997, Rowand returned to Broadway in The Young Man from Atlanta, as an understudy for the roles of Lily Dale Kidder and Miss Lacey.

In 2015, Rowand appeared as Elizabeth, an elderly mother with memory loss who has to contend with her fighting caretaker children, in Kate Hawley's play Complications from a Fall, which ran at Center Stage Theater in Santa Cruz, California.

Filmography

References

External links
 https://www.imdb.com/name/nm0746440/

Living people
1936 births
American soap opera actresses
American stage actresses
American television actresses
People from Sparta, Illinois
Actresses from Illinois
University of Illinois alumni
20th-century American actresses
21st-century American actresses